Shahjahan Begum  (29 July 1838 – 16 June 1901) was the Nawab Begum of Bhopal (the ruler of the Islamic principality of Bhopal in central India) for two periods: 1844–60 (her mother acting as regent), and secondly during 1868–1901.

Biography 

Born in Islamnagar, near Bhopal, Shahjahan was the only surviving child of Sikandar Begum of Bhopal, sometime Nawab of Bhopal by correct title, and her husband Jahangir Mohammed Khan. She was recognised as ruler of Bhopal in 1844 at the age of six; her mother wielded power as regent during her minority. However, in 1860, her mother Sikandar Begum was recognised by the British as ruler of Bhopal in her own right, and Shahjahan was set aside. Shahjahan succeeded her mother as Begum of Bhopal upon the death of the latter in 1868.

Having been groomed for leadership of the state, Shahjahan improved the tax revenue system and increased state intake, raised the salaries of her soldiers, modernised the military's arms, built a dam and an artificial lake, improved the efficiency of the police force and undertook the first census after the state suffered two plagues (the population had dropped to 744,000). To balance her budget deficit, she commissioned the farming of opium.

She has been credited with the authorship of several books in Urdu. Among them are the Gauhar-i-Iqbaal, which describes the major events between the 1st and 7th years of her regime and the socio-political conditions of Bhopal at that time. An Account of My Life is the English translation of Sultan Jahan Begum's autobiography, Gauhar-e-Iqbal. It was written by C. H. Payne, who was the education advisor to the Begum. She wrote the Akhtar-i-Iqbaal which is the second part of Gauhar-i-Iqbaal. In 1918 she wrote the Iffat-ul-Muslimaat, where she describes the notions of purdah ad hijab in customs in Europe, Asia, and Egypt.

She was instrumental in initiating the construction of one of the largest mosques in India, the Taj-ul-Masajid, at Bhopal. The construction however remained incomplete at her death and was later abandoned; work was resumed only in 1971. She also built the Taj Mahal palace at Bhopal. While Shahjahan had desired to perform the Muslim pilgrimage to Mecca, frail health and her phobia of shipwrecks prevented her from ever doing so.

Shahjahan Begum made sizeable donations towards the building of a mosque at Woking, Surrey in the UK. She also contributed generously towards the founding of the Muhammadan Anglo-Oriental College at Aligarh, which developed into the Aligarh Muslim University. She also subsidised the cost of a railway to be constructed between Hoshangabad and Bhopal.

In 1855, Shahjahan Begum married Baqi Muhammad Khan, a nobleman of middle rank of Bhopal, as his third wife. He died in 1867. Four years later, Shahjahan married Siddiq Hasan Khan of Kannauj in the then United Provinces. The second marriage was childless. In addition to the deaths of two husbands, Shahjahan also experienced the deaths of two granddaughters.

Shahjahan Begum's final years were spent in leadership of a reasonably well-run state. In 1901 she was afflicted with cancer of the mouth; shortly thereafter, a message was published for the people of Bhopal asking forgiveness if Shahjahan had wronged any of her subjects, causing public grief over the illness of a popular ruler. Shahjahan was visited for one last time by her daughter Sultan Jehan, with whom Shahjahan had not spoken for thirteen years as Shahjahan had blamed her daughter for the death of her first granddaughter; even at this final meeting, Shahjahan refused to forgive her daughter. Shahjahan died shortly thereafter on 6 June 1901, and Sultan Jehan assumed the throne.

Postal services

During her reign the first postage stamps of the Bhopal state were issued. In 1876 and 1878 there were issues of half and quarter anna stamps. Those of 1876 have text "HH Nawab Shahjahan Begam" in an octagonal frame; the 1878 stamps the same text in a round frame and the Urdu form of the Begum's title. The last stamps bearing her name were issued in 1902 with inscription: "H.H. Nawab Sultan Jahan Begam". (The state postal service of Bhopal issued its own postage stamps until 1949; from the second issue of stamps in 1908 official stamps were issued until 1945 and these had the inscriptions "Bhopal State" or "Bhopal Govt." In 1949 two surcharged stamps were issued, the last of Bhopal's own stamps.)

Publications (selected)
 The Taj-ul Ikbal Tarikh Bhopal, Or, The History of Bhopal, by Shah Jahan Begum, translated from the Urdu by H. D. Barstow. Calcutta: Thacker, Spink, 1876.

References

Sources
The Begums of Bhopal: A Dynasty of Women Rulers in Raj India, by Shahraryar M. Khan. Published by I. B.Tauris, 2000. . Excerpts

Further reading
Hayat-i-Shahjehani: Life of Her Highness the late Nawab Shahjehan Begum of Bhopal; translated by B. Ghosal. Bombay : Times Press, 1926.
 Siobhan Lambert-Hurley Muslim Women, Reform and Princely Patronage: Nawab Sultan Jahan Begam of Bhopal. Routledge, 2007. .
 Chopra, R. M., "Eminent Poetesses of Persian ", Iran Society, Kolkata, 2010.

External links
Woking Mosque and the Woking Muslim Mission

1838 births
1901 deaths
Begums of Bhopal
Muslim monarchs
Muslim writers
19th-century Indian women writers
19th-century Indian writers
Knights Grand Commander of the Order of the Star of India
Knights Grand Commander of the Order of the Indian Empire
Companions of the Order of the Crown of India
Queens regnant in Asia
Urdu-language writers from India
Indian women philanthropists
Writers from Madhya Pradesh
Women writers from Madhya Pradesh
19th-century Indian royalty
Indian women historians
19th-century Indian historians
19th-century Indian Muslims
20th-century Indian Muslims
19th-century women rulers
Women educators from Madhya Pradesh
Educators from Madhya Pradesh
19th-century Indian philanthropists
20th-century Indian women
20th-century Indian people
19th-century women philanthropists
Indian monarchs